Paul Biedermann (born 7 August 1986) is a German retired competitive swimmer, a 200 and 400 metre freestyle long course world champion. He holds the long course and short course world records in the 200 meters freestyle, and the long course world record in the 400 meters freestyle.

Career
In 2008, Biedermann was ranked 9th in the world in the 200 m freestyle and 21st in the world in the 400 m freestyle. He won the 200 m freestyle long course at the 2008 European Aquatics Championships final, finishing in a time of 1:46.59. His times for the 400 m freestyle (3:47.69) and 200 m freestyle (NR in 1:46.37)  qualified him for the Olympic Games in Beijing. At the Olympics, he placed fifth in the 200 m freestyle final (1:46.00) and 17th overall in the 400 m freestyle (3:48.03).

2009 Long Course and 2010 Short Course World Championships

On 26 July 2009, Biedermann won the 400 m freestyle final at the 2009 World Aquatics Championships. He passed 1500 m Olympic champion Oussama Mellouli in the final 50 metres and finished with a time of 3:40.07, shaving nearly three seconds off his own personal best and bettering Ian Thorpe's 2002 world record by one-hundredth of a second. On 28 July, he claimed his second gold of the meet in the 200 m freestyle, defeating Michael Phelps in a world record time of 1:42.00 and cutting more than four seconds off of his time since the year before. Many criticise the authenticity of Biedermann's world records in the 200m and 400m freestyle, as they were swum with the now banned "super-suits," such as the LZR Racer, that were proven to give an advantage particularly over the longer distance freestyle races.

In the 2010 Short Course Worlds, Biedermann won gold in the 400 m freestyle, beating Oussama Mellouli again in a race that unfolded almost identically to their race in Rome the previous year. In the 200 m freestyle, although he was the world record holder, he only placed 5th. He was over a second behind the first-place finisher Ryan Lochte.

2011 Long Course World Championships
Biedermann collected bronze medals in the 200 m freestyle, 400 m freestyle, and 4 × 100 m medley relay, as well as finishing 4th in the 4 × 200 m freestyle relay. He was out-touched by Michael Phelps by 0.09 seconds in the individual 200 m freestyle. However, Biedermann got the better of Phelps in the relay lead-off leg by beating him by 0.33 seconds.

2012 Summer Olympics 
At the 2012 Summer Olympics, he competed in the 200 m freestyle, finishing 5th (0.6 seconds from a medal); the 400 m freestyle; and the 4 x 200 m freestyle relay as a member of the German team that finished 4th.

2016 Summer Olympics 
At the 2016 Summer Olympics, he competed in the 200 m freestyle where he finished in 6th place. He also competed as part of the 4 x 200 m freestyle relay team which finished in 6th place. Following the games, he announced his retirement from competitive swimming.

Personal bests
 200 m freestyle: 1:42.00 (28 July 2009) WR
 400 m freestyle: 3:40.07 (26 July 2009) WR

See also
 World record progression 200 metres freestyle
 World record progression 400 metres freestyle

References

External links

 
 
 
 
 
 
 Profile at i-swimmer.ru 
  

1986 births
Living people
Sportspeople from Halle (Saale)
People from Bezirk Halle
German male swimmers
German male freestyle swimmers
Olympic swimmers of Germany
Swimmers at the 2008 Summer Olympics
Swimmers at the 2012 Summer Olympics
Swimmers at the 2016 Summer Olympics
World record holders in swimming
World Aquatics Championships medalists in swimming
Medalists at the FINA World Swimming Championships (25 m)
European Aquatics Championships medalists in swimming